Fortress (aka Flying Fortress) is a 2012 war film directed by Michael R. Phillips and stars Bug Hall, Donnie Jeffcoat, Sean McGowan and Joseph Williamson. The film was released by Bayou Pictures and although initially intended for wider release, was a direct-to-video release on July 31, 2012 made by Monarch Video. Fortress takes its name from the iconic Boeing B-17 Flying Fortress World War II bomber that was the centerpiece of the aerial battle in Europe.

Fortress follows the crew of the B-17 Flying Fortress bomber, named Lucky Lass and its crew as they fly in the campaign against Italy during World War II. The opening title sequence in Fortress provides a background on the Mediterranean Theater of Operations and a plan to strike the Italian capital of Rome on July 19, 1943.

Plot
The B-17F Lucky Lass, part of the United States Army Air Forces (USAAF) 99th Bombardment Group (Heavy) (the "Diamondbacks") from the 12th Air Force is stationed at Navrin, Algeria in 1943. We learn in the opening reveal that air crews are expected to complete 25 combat missions before they can be sent home. However, losses are heavy and the odds are that only 2 in 10 will survive 25 missions. During a raid on Gerbini, Italy, with her Irish-American crew, the Lucky Lass is heavily damaged and the pilot "Pops" (Jamie Martz), and both waist gunners, Jake (Anthony Ocasio) and Joe (Steve Holm) are killed.

Five days later, Wally (Donnie Jeffcoat) is now the Lass' aircraft commander, and replacements arrive. Co-pilot Michael Schmidt (Bug Hall) reports to Wally, and two new waist gunners, Tom (Jeremy Ray Valdez) and Oliver (Tony Elias), introduce themselves to the enlisted crewmen. On their walk-around of the North African base, the replacements are introduced to the alcohol still that flight engineer Burt (Chris Owen) has put together from bomber parts and other scraps. Burt explains that the Army adds ethanol to boost the octane rating of aviation fuel, so they are cooking the fuel to distill out the alcohol. The crew, anxious to get back into the air, push maintenance chief Sgt. Caparelli (Howard Gibson) to clear their aircraft to fly. After some griping, Caparelli tells the men that the Lass has already been cleared earlier that day. The crew throws a party/wake to celebrate their return to flight status and mourn their losses. Only Wally dares to sample the local cuisine, goat meat and couscous, while everyone else sticks to their C-rations. Michael is present and appears standoffish. Further alienating him from the crew, he does not join in Wally's toast to their recently departed crewman because he doesn't drink.  Wally takes the new young pilot outside and gives him some advice to try harder to fit in, including drinking with the men.

During the next mission which is supposed to be a "milk run", or easy mission, an already hungover Wally succumbs to ptomaine poisoning. Michael takes over the controls. The squadron is ordered to fly into the clouds in a roundabout course to avoid flak emplacements on the approach to the target in Messina, Sicily. Michael simply tries to keep an eye on the plane in front of him and doesn't use instrument navigation. Unfortunately, when the Lass comes out of the clouds, the rest of the squadron is nowhere to be seen. Not only are they off course, they have flown over territory heavily defended by anti-aircraft guns. They abort and manage to make it home without any injury. A despondent Michael tells Wally that he's going to apply for a transfer to another plane. Wally says that while getting lost is a serious screw up, bad things just happen. He convinces Michael that the crew will eventually forgive him and suggests he start by admitting his mistake and apologizing to the crew. However, as he approaches the crew's tent, he overhears them making disparaging comments about him. The complain that they won't get credit for what was an easy mission, and he realizes now is not the right time to talk to the men. That night, there is a fierce sandstorm forcing everyone on the base to take cover. Burt finishes collecting a batch of alcohol, but in his haste to get away from the storm, he fails to shut down the still, allowing the flammable liquid to drip and pool on the ground.

To help boost the crews' confidence in Michael, Wally lets him take the pilot's chair. Shortly after takeoff, the pilots notice the oil pressure rising rapidly, and the engines begin losing power. Since they can't stay in formation, the Lass is forced to abort yet another milk run to Messina. To make matters worse, the still is destroyed in a fiery explosion. The crew blames Michael at first, considering him a jinx.  Later, the squadron limps back, indicating that it had not been an easy mission. At the debriefing, we learn that the squadron's fighter protection was diverted, and enemy fighters had unexpectedly shown up over the target. Wally assures Michael that by aborting the mission, he had perhaps saved their lives.

With the Lucky Lass grounded and the squadron decimated, some of the Lass' crew are mixed into other crews for the next mission. Charlie (Manu Intiraymi), Eddie  (Joseph Williamson) and Michael are not assigned. Michael feels guilty at missing yet another mission, but his crewmates point out this is a blessing in disguise because as the only officer on the ground, he can ensure that Caparelli fixes the plane properly. After having worked all night to ready the squadron for today's mission, Caparelli is loath to order his men to work in the 105 degree in the shade heat. He tells Michael they've already checked the plane and didn't find any mechanical problems, but Michael won't take it lying down. After reading Caparelli the riot act, he persuades Caparelli to inspect the Lass again to discover the "gremlins" that brought down the aircraft. Since excessive oil pressure was the problem, Michael insists that Caparelli take apart the oil pumps despite the new pump having been installed just last week, and a visual inspection not revealing anything. Caparelli reluctantly follows Michael's orders and discovers that the oil lines have been fouled with sand from the last sandstorm. Meanwhile, to make good on a promise to Al (Tim Hade) for a celebration on his safe return, and with no alcohol left, Charlie is caught stealing liquor from the officers' club by the quartermaster, Monroe (Matt Biedel), and is facing a summary court-martial. Eddie pleads with Michael to intervene with Col Shay (John Laughlin), the "Old Man". Michael arrives just as the colonel asks Charlie if he has an exonerating explanation. Michael explains about the Lass' newly discovered mechanical problems, and claims he ordered Charlie to get alcohol to use as a solvent to clean the oil lines, and accepts blame because he wasn't explicit enough in his order to Charlie to get it legitimately. The colonel pretends to believe Michael's ridiculous lie and lets Charlie off. Monroe protests, but the colonel dresses him down and tells Monroe he doesn't have time to waste on anything that doesn't affect the operational efficiency of the squadron and dismisses Monroe. Before dismissing Charlie, the colonel asks why he only grabbed Scotch whiskey, to which he replied the Lass is an Irish bomber with discriminating taste. The colonel takes a bottle from the case and chuckles to himself after Michael and Charlie leave. That night the whole crew celebrate Charlie's vindication, and declare Michael an honorary Irishman, christening him, "O'Schmidt".

July 19 arrives and the Lass is cleared to fly the Rome mission. On the final run to the IP, Burt is blinded by shrapnel from anti-aircraft fire, but they continue and manage to release their bombs over the target. However, as they make the turn home, a B-17 flying above them is hit and begins falling in their direction. They take evasive action, but the doomed bomber's wing clips part of the Lass' right horizontal stabilizer, causing them to go into an uncontrolled climb until they stall and begins a lateral spin. The plane loses altitude rapidly as Michael and Wally struggle desperate to regain control.

At the last second, Michael and Wally manage to pull up, but they are now very low over Rome and taking heavy ground fire. As they reach the edge of the city, a barrage of flak takes out another engine and obliterates Wally. Back in the waist, Tom checks on a wounded Oliver. Oliver says he's OK. As Tom turns back to his guns, another flak round kills him instantly. Michael asks Archie (Sean McGowan) to come to the cockpit to help him fly, since the navigator was once in flight school. Archie makes his way to the cockpit without saying a word about his wounds. He looks at the pulped flesh that used to be Wally before climbing into the seat. The Lucky Lass gets away from Rome, and makes a run for a British airbase at Malta.

Michael asks Al from his position as the ball turret gunner about their situation. He reports that aside from the knocked-out engines and other damage, the B-17 appears to be fine. However, the damaged port landing gear falls away as it's being lowered, leaving Michael no choice but to order everyone to bail out. Michael, not noticing that Archie is wounded, leaves the cockpit with Archie at the controls.

As Michael helps the crew bail out, Archie begins to cough up blood. Archie opens the bomb bay doors and makes his way back to Michael as the last of the crew exits the plane. As he turns around, Michael is horrified to see blood soaked Archie, obviously in excruciating pain. Archie knows he's not going to make it. As Michael tries to help him get ready to bail out, he sees Archie's parachute has been destroyed. Michael says that they can land the aircraft on the water or both jump together using his parachute. Archie nods, but he then tells Michael to "take care of the boys" and pushes Michael out. Archie makes his way back into the pilot's chair to take control of the B-17 and starts climbing, but in its damaged state, it cannot take the stress and disintegrates, taking the navigator with it.

Some time later, back at Narvin, a new replacement checks in with Michael, now the flight commander of a new bomber, starting the cycle again.

Cast

 Bug Hall as 2nd Lt Michael Schmidt, (co-pilot), (pilot/aircraft commander)
 Donnie Jeffcoat as 1st Lt Wally McAllister, (co-pilot), later, (pilot/aircraft commander)
 Sean McGowan as 2nd Lt Archie Mason, (navigator)
 Chris Owen as Burt, (top turret gunner/flight engineer)
 Edward Finlay as 2nd Lt F. "Philly" Phelps, (bombardier)
 Manu Intiraymi as Sgt Charlie O'Hara, (radio operator)
 John Laughlin as Col Shay, base commander
 Howard Gibson as Sgt "Cap" Caparelli, crew chief
 Joseph Williamson as Eddie, (tail gunner)
 Tony Elias as Sgt Oliver Giscard, (waist gunner)
 Tim Hade as Al, (ventral ball turret gunner)
 Jeremy Ray Valdez as Sgt Tom Martinez, (waist gunner)
 Jamie Martz as 1st Lt L. "Pops" O'Connor, (pilot/aircraft commander)
 Mark Doerr as briefing officer
 Matt Biedel as 1st Lt Monroe, quartermaster
 Anthony Ocasio as Jake, (waist gunner)
 Steve Holm as Joe, (waist gunner)
 Bobby Naderi as Ziri
 Drew Van Acker as 2nd Lt Bob Tremaine, (co-pilot)

Production
In the closing credits, Fortress filmmakers make the sardonic declaration, "No B-17s were hurt in the making of this film." The statement was accurate as the low budget feature could not afford to use actual surviving B-17s, either in private collections or in museums. With principal photography undertaken in 2011, Radical 3D was responsible for the authentic computer-generated imagery (CGI) film effects. The company's involvement with Lucasfilm, Fox Television, IMAX, Warner Brothers and Disney was in feature work, including the similar productions, George Lucas’s  Red Tails (2012) and the Tom Hanks production of Beyond All Boundaries (2009) (for which effects have been nominated for a VES award).

Radical 3D was also involved in television projects for Discovery Channel, History Channel and National Geographic Channel including 24 and Dogfights (premiered in 2006), the highest rated series on the History Channel during its first season.

For Fortress, a full-scale interior mock-up was made, recreating the fuselage from tail to cockpit. The principal exterior visual effects began with a CGI rendition that had a unique origin. The producers acquired a 1:28 scale Guillow’s B-17 Balsa wood "flying" model and scaled it up, producing, in effect, a 1:1 B-17 scale model. The upper fuselage, above the “side keels” was placed on a wooden ladder frame, which rested, in turn, on scrap tires. Manipulating the setup, the fuselage was jostled to simulate turbulence and make the actors react to the motion of the aircraft.

Location photography for the Algerian scenes in Fortress took place at Rocking Horse Ranch, Ramona, California in 2011. Other studio work was completed at Radical 3D facilities in Culver City, California.

Historical context
Fortress depicted accurately the bombing of Rome in World War II in 1943, primarily by Allied aircraft, before the city was freed by the Allies on June 4, 1944. Pope Pius XII was initially unsuccessful in attempting to have Rome declared an open city, although negotiations took place with President Roosevelt via Cardinal Francis Spellman. 

The first Allied bombardment occurred on July 19, 1943 and was carried out by 500 American bombers (a mix of B-17 and B-24 bombers). A total of 1,168 tons of bombs resulted in the entire working class district of San Lorenzo being destroyed with 3,000 Italian civilians killed in the raids over five residential/railway districts. The military targets were few, the largest Stazione Termini contained a marshalling yard, railways and industries that manufactured steel, textile products and glass. In the 110,000 sorties that comprised the Allied Rome air campaign, 600 aircraft were lost and 3,600 air crew members died; 60,000 tons of bombs were dropped in the 78 days before Rome was captured.

The producers gave "very special thanks" to the Planes of Fame Air Museum, Chino, California and also credited 21 technical advisors including staff at the Yanks Air Museum, also in Chino.

Reception
Due to its direct-to-video release, Fortress was not critically reviewed, however, Danny Shamon reviewed the video in 2011, identifying the film elements that were effective, "For a low budget film I thought the aerial combat and filming were fantastic. I liked the sets, and it is obvious that some time was taken on the outfits, and items used during this time period.". Reviewer Ray Nyland noted: " 'Fortress is a low budget film that delivers. The air action sequences are loud, frenetic and exciting with some genuine heart in mouth moments. The camera shakes as the B-17 ploughs through heavy flak, and German fighters flash and spin past, all the time accompanied by explosions and machinegun fire that resonates around the speakers. Most of the model and CGI work of the air battles are neatly done, and believable ..."

In TV Tropes, Fortress was characterized as: "Despite a shoestring production budget that made for lots of conspicuous CGI, the movie was very well-researched and well-executed."

See also
 Strategic bombing during World War II

References

Notes

Citations

Bibliography

 Bowers, Peter M. Fortress in the Sky: The Story of Boeing's B-17. Granada Hills, CaliforniaL Sentry Books, 1976. . 
 Döge, F.U. Pro- und antifaschistischer Neorealismus"Die militärische und innenpolitische Entwicklung in Italien 1943-1944, Chapter 11,  (PhD Thesis). Berlin: Free University Berlin, 2004. 
 Freeman, Roger A. B-17 Fortress at War. New York: Charles Scribner's Sons, 1977. .
 Lytton, H.D. "Bombing Policy in the Rome and Pre-Normandy Invasion Aerial Campaigns of World War II: Bridge-Bombing Strategy Vindicated – and Railyard-Bombing Strategy Invalidated". Military Affairs, Volume 47, Issue 2: April, 1983, p.p. 53–58.
 Murphy, Robert. British Cinema and the Second World War. London: Continuum, 2000. . 
 Willmott, H.P. B-17 Flying Fortress. London: Bison Books, 1980. .

External links
 
 Fortress page at Signature Entertainment
 Production Company Page at Bayou Pictures.com

2012 films
Films about the United States Army Air Forces
Italian Campaign of World War II films
American aviation films
Boeing B-17 Flying Fortress
World War II films based on actual events
2010s English-language films
2010s American films